San Roque is a city in Corrientes Province, Argentina. It is the head town of the San Roque Department.

The settlement was established on October 11, 1773.

External links

Populated places in Corrientes Province
Populated places established in 1773